The Athens Classic Marathon The Authentic is an annual marathon road race held in Athens, Greece, normally in early November (the second Sunday of November), since 1972.  It also often serves as Greece's national marathon championships.  The race attracted 43,000 competitors in 2015 of which 16,000 were for the 42.195 kilometre (26.2 mile) course, both numbers being an all-time record for the event. The rest of the runners competed in the concurrent 5 and 10 kilometres road races and the racewalking contest.

The marathon race and course is inspired by the Ancient Greek legend of Pheidippides, a messenger who is said to have run from Marathon to Athens to bring news of the Greek victory over the Persians at the Battle of Marathon.

Taking from the tradition of the Olympic Torch, the race features the Marathon Flame, which is lit at the Tomb of the Battle of Marathon and carried to the stadium in Marathon before the beginning of each race.  In addition, an international marathon symposium is held the day before the race.

Greek competitors have traditionally been strong in the men's and women's competitions. However, East Africans and Japanese runners have increasingly become the dominant runners from 1999 onwards. The current course records are 2:10:37 hours for men, set by Felix Kandie in 2014, while Rasa Drazdauskaitė's run of 2:31:06 in 2010 is the quickest by a woman on the course.

History 

The provenance of the competitive race is traced back to the Marathon race at the 1896 Olympics. 

A separate race from the town of Marathon to Athens was regularly held in April from 1955 to at least 1989. This unrelated race, known as the Athens Marathon, frequently served as the Greek championship race but it is now discontinued.

The Athens Classic Marathon began in 1972 as a joint venture between the Greek tourist board and athletics association. 

In 1982, the organisers dedicated the race to Grigoris Lambrakis, an athlete and Member of the Greek Parliament, whose murder in the 1960s has become an inspirational cause for advocates of human rights.

The race came under the auspices of the current organisers and SEGAS in 1983 and has since become a major race, being awarded Gold Label Road Race status by the IAAF. The 1983 event was known as the Athens Peace Marathon and both a popular and elite level race featured for the first time that year.

Since 1990, the Athens Classic Marathon has often served as the Greek national championships for the marathon event. 

Since 2007 the Association of International Marathons and Distance Races has organised an annual International Marathon Symposium in Marathon town the day prior to the race.

The 2010 edition of the event was combined with the celebration of the 2500th anniversary of the Battle of Marathon.  As the 2500 anniversary was actually in 2011, this year was also celebrated as the anniversary run.

In 2016, a refugee team competed in the concurrent 5 kilometre road race.

The 2020 in-person edition of the race was cancelled due to the coronavirus pandemic, with all registrants given the option of transferring their entry to 2021 or obtaining a full refund.

Course 

The marathon course is based on the legend from which the race gained its name: Pheidippides, a messenger in Ancient Greece, ran from the Battle of Marathon to Athens to announce the Greeks' victory over the Persians.

It is perhaps the most difficult major marathon race: the course is uphill from the 10 km mark to the 31 km mark – the toughest uphill climb of any major marathon. The course begins in the town of Marathon, where it passes the tomb of the Athenian soldiers, and it traces a path near the coast through Nea Makri. Following the steep rise, the course goes lightly downhill towards the city of Athens. It passes a statue of a runner (Ο Δρομέας) in the city centre before finishing up at the Panathinaiko Stadium; a site for athletics competitions in ancient times and the finishing point for both the 1896 and 2004 Olympic marathons.

Past winners 

Key:

Statistics

Winners by country

Multiple winners

Attendance

References
General
Athens Classic Marathon. Association of Road Racing Statisticians (2008-11-27). Retrieved on 2009-11-08.

Specific

External links
Official website
Official Merchandise
Marathon Course Profile

Marathons in Greece
Classic Marathon
Recurring sporting events established in 1972
Battle of Marathon
Autumn events in Greece
Athletics in Athens
1972 establishments in Greece